Lift Me Up is the second single by Russian singer-songwriter Lena Katina's debut solo studio album This Is Who I Am. The song was written by Lena, Jasmine Ash and Jacques Brautbar, who also produced it. On 1 July 2016, a Spanish version for the song called "Levántame" was also produced for the Spanish translated Katina's debut album. A remixes EP was also released and the songs peaked at 31 on Billboard Dance Hot Club Songs.

Track listing
 Digital Download
 "Lift Me Up" - 3:22

 Levantame (Spanish Version)
 "Levantame" - 3:22

 Lift Me Up - The Remixes
 "Lift Me Up" (Dave Audé Club Remix) - 5:52
 "Lift Me Up" (Dave Audé Radio Remix) - 3:44
 "Lift Me Up" (Nacho Chapado & Ivan Gomez Club Remix) - 5:26
 "Lift Me Up" (Nacho Chapado & Ivan Gomez Radio Remix) - 3:21
 "Lift Me Up" (Dirty Valente & Kevin D Remix) - 4:17
 "Lift Me Up" (Maxon (De) Remix) - 6:18
 "Lift Me Up" (Mykel Mars Remix) - 6:01
 "Levantame" (Dave Audé Club Remix) - 5:52
 "Levantame" (Dave Audé Radio Remix) - 3:41
 "Levantame" (Maxon (De) Remix) - 6:18

Music video
Lift Me Up is weighted with the feel good factor, and pays tribute to Lena’s legion of hardcore fans that have supported her journey of re-invention. Lena is seen in the video clip, pinning up snapshots of her fans with their own ‘Lift Me Up’ slogans of support.

Charts

References

2011 singles
Lena Katina songs
2011 songs